Jo Peacock is a former South African international lawn bowler.

Bowls career
Peacock won a silver medal in the Women's pairs at the 1994 Commonwealth Games in Victoria with Lyn Dwyer.

In 1995 she won the singles and pairs gold medals at the Atlantic Bowls Championships, the latter partnering Lorna Trigwell.

References

Living people
South African female bowls players
Bowls players at the 1994 Commonwealth Games
Commonwealth Games silver medallists for South Africa
Commonwealth Games medallists in lawn bowls
Year of birth missing (living people)
Medallists at the 1994 Commonwealth Games